Darril Wegscheid (born July 14, 1944) was an American politician and businessman.

Wegscheild lived with his wife and family in Apple Valley, Minnesota. He received his bachelor's degree from University of St. Thomas, in 1966 and his master's degree from University of Pennsylvania in 1968. Wegscheid worked for 3M and was a manager for the informational system. He served on the Rosemount-Apple Valley School Board and was a Democrat. Wegscheid served in the Minnesota Senate from 1983 to 1989.

References

1944 births
Living people
People from Apple Valley, Minnesota
University of St. Thomas (Minnesota) alumni
University of Pennsylvania alumni
3M people
School board members in Minnesota
Democratic Party Minnesota state senators